"AA" is a song by American country music singer Walker Hayes. It was released on November 19, 2021 as the third single from his third studio album Country Stuff the Album. Hayes and Shane McAnally co-wrote the song with Luke Laird, and co-produced it with Joe Thibodeau.

Content
"AA" is a song that conveys Hayes' anxiety as a dad and his love for wife, as well as his sobriety. In a press release, he said: "I've struggled with alcohol abuse and sometimes I wish I didn't need AA, but I do. I think a lot of people can relate to that". In an interview with Celebsecrets, Hayes called it as "A Dad-Anthem". Chris Parton of Sounds Like Nashville described the song as a "chasing his dreams while juggling fatherhood, marriage and his all-too relatable vices".

Charts

Weekly charts

Year-end charts

Release history

Certifications

References

2021 singles
2021 songs
Walker Hayes songs
Songs about anxiety
Monument Records singles
Song recordings produced by Shane McAnally
Songs written by Luke Laird
Songs written by Shane McAnally
Songs about fathers
Songs about alcohol